Matthew Bartholomew (born 20 October 1988) is a Trinidad and Tobago football player, who currently plays for Point Fortin.

References 

1988 births
Living people
Trinidad and Tobago footballers
TT Pro League players
Point Fortin Civic F.C. players
Association football forwards
Trinidad and Tobago international footballers